Israeli MIA are members of the Israel Defense Forces who are missing in action. Despite efforts to locate them and bring them home, their whereabouts remain unknown. Every year, a state ceremony is held at Mount Herzl, Israel's military cemetery in Jerusalem.

IDF prisoners of war

During the 1947–1949 Palestine war, defenders of a few communities were captured and forced to surrender to the enemy. Among others were soldiers from Gush Etzion and defenders of the Jewish quarter.

In the Yom Kippur War 301 Israelis were captured by Syria and Egypt, 232 of whom by the Egyptians, 65 by the Syrians and 4 by the Lebanese. The majority of them were captured in the first stage of that war. Some Israeli soldiers reported after their release about the difficult conditions they faced: they were severely beaten by their captors, sometimes making them unconscious, while many  reported that they were being investigated under torture.

IDF soldiers taken prisoner by Arab paramilitary groups are often treated particularly harshly and their release is sometimes delayed for years, due to the difficulty in negotiating with these organizations. There are considerable differences in terminology between the parties - the Israeli media refers to them as "kidnapped soldiers", while the Arab media are calls them "captives" or occasionally "prisoners of war".

Known Israeli MIAs
 Members of the 362th battalion declared missing after the Battle of Sultan Yacoub in Lebanon on June 12, 1982: Zechariah Baumel (body recovered in 2019), Tzvi Feldman, and Yehuda Katz.
 Ron Arad, an IDF F-4 Phantom II navigator, was lost over Lebanon on October 16, 1986.
 Guy Hever disappeared on duty in the Golan Heights on August 17, 1997.

Procedure and guidelines
IDF soldiers are told to completely avoid providing any information to captors, besides their basic identification information, however this has failed many times due to extreme pressures.

According to Reuben Yardor, a military intelligence leader of the Yom Kippur War, the automatic assumption they made was that all that's known to their captured soldiers is also known to the captors.

Several publicized stories of Israeli prisoners of war were:

 Corporal Uri Ilan, undercover soldier in the Golani Brigade who committed suicide in a Syrian prison in 1955, leaving a note in which he wrote, "I did not betray."
 Lieutenant Colonel Avi Nir, fighter pilot shot down and captured during the Yom Kippur War, died in captivity without revealing secrets to his captors. He was posthumously awarded the Medal of Courage, for "[He] was tortured to death by investigators but revealed no information. Doing so demonstrates loyalty and supreme sacrifice."
 Lieutenant Amos Levinberg, intelligence officer taken captive by the Syrians in the beginning the Yom Kippur War, and gave his captors a lot of information. He was eventually released in a prisoner exchange.

Efforts to release MIAs and legacy

When it became possible, the IDF military rescue operation team went on secret missions. A notable one was the failed rescue attempt of Nachshon Wachsman on October 14, 1994, where he was killed along with Nir Poraz, one of the rescuers.

Israel's official policy is not to release convicted terrorists for the release of abducted civilians or soldiers. In practice this policy has not been implemented since Menachem Begin's prime ministership, as Israel showed willingness to secure the release its MIAs (and in some cases of soldiers' remains) in exchange for a large number of Arab security prisoners held by Israel, even those who have killed Israeli civilians, and has done so in multiple occasions.

Garden of the Missing in Action
A memorial garden, Garden of the Missing in Action, is located in the National Military and Police Cemetery on Mount Herzl in Jerusalem.

See also
 Gilad Shalit
 Majdi Halabi
 List of Israeli prisoner exchanges

References

Further reading
 
 Public Law 106–89 106th Congress, US Congress, November 8, 1999

External links
 EITAN - Missing in Action Accounting Unit  of the IDF
 ICMIS Home Page: The International Coalition for Missing Israeli Soldiers

Arab–Israeli conflict
Military personnel missing in action
Israeli military personnel